= Women Advocates Research and Documentation Centre =

Nonprofit organization

- Type: Non-profit; NGO
- Headquarters: Lagos, Nigeria
- Location: Nigeria
- Services: Promoting gender equality, respect for human rights and social justice for women and girls in Nigeria
- Founder: Abiola Akiyode Afolabi
- Website: wardcnigeria.org

Women Advocates Research and Documentation Centre (WARDC) nonprofit organization established in the year 2000 with the focus on combating human rights abuse against women, gender-based violence, child abuse, gender equality and justice for women and girls in Nigeria. It is registered with the Cooperate Affairs Commission Nigeria and has impacted impacted women and girls in Nigeria through its sensitizations, activities, campaigns and assistance.

== History ==
The Women Advocates Research and Documentation Center (WARDC) was formed by a group of young and vibrant feminist lawyers who sort out to assist vulnerable women and girls in Nigeria by providing legal advices and human right issues assistance. The centre has evolved overtime to becoming an organisation which has contributed to curbing the menace of Gender Based Violence in Nigeria, enlightening women on their rights, mobilization and participation through advocacy and provision of legal services for girls and women.

The centre also provides pro bono legal services for women and girls who are victims of gender-based violence, counselling and complete rehabilitation of victims across all the communities with its representation in Nigeria.

== Vision and missions ==
The vision of the centre includes to provide a society where every girl and women will have equal access to life, freedom and also be freed from every form of oppression and gender based violence. The mission of the centre involves working together with other similars organisations through supporting campaigns against gender based violence, provision of litigation services and also overall policy reformation geared towards improving the life and rights of women and girls in Nigeria. Some core values of the centre includes, Respect, Accountability, Transparency and Integrity.

== Impact and achievements ==
Women Advocates Research and Documentation Centre (WARDC) has recorded significant success since its inception in 2000. The centre has worked with different networks of women, victims of gender based violence, women with disabilities and sex workers. The group has also established the young feminist leadership in schools through the setting up of the purple club in 2013.

The centre has also collaborated with some international bodies like the European Union and the United Nations to enlighten members of the society on women rights and social accountability in Nigeria. The Director of the centre, Dr. Abiola Akiyode-Afolabi in one her workshops confirmed that 30% of women between the age of 15 and 49 years have at one point or the other being victims of sexual gender based violence.
